The Whirlpool Rapids Bridge, commonly known as the Whirlpool Bridge or the Lower Steel Arch Bridge (before 1937), is a spandrel braced, riveted, two-hinged arch bridge that crosses the international border between Canada and the United States, connecting the commercial downtown districts of Niagara Falls, Ontario and Niagara Falls, New York. It was acquired by the Niagara Falls Bridge Commission in January 1959. Immediately upstream is the similar arch-style Michigan Central Railway Bridge, which has been out of service since 2001.

History

The predecessor of the Whirlpool Rapids Bridge was the Niagara Falls Suspension Bridge, which carried foot and rail traffic, opened in 1855, and was most notable for being the world's first working railway suspension bridge and for being the bridge that was used by Abolitionists running the Underground Railroad to get slaves to freedom in Canada. By the late 1800s, the suspension bridge was becoming outdated for railroad needs. The weight of trains in North America had greatly increased by the mid-1890s. Larger and more powerful locomotives were required to pull cars that handled an increasing number of passengers and goods; compared to the  locomotives crossing the bridge in the 1850s,  locomotives were the common engines 40 years later. The weight of these trains exceeded the specifications of the Suspension Bridge, and the bridge companies took the opportunity to review and request the replacement of the bridge.

Civil engineer Leffert L. Buck, who had been hired to maintain the Suspension Bridge, was selected to design the replacement bridge. He settled for a bridge of the arch design. At that time, arch bridges were the new models for railway bridges and were more cost-efficient than suspension bridges. Buck built the new bridge around and below the Suspension Bridge, replacing it a piece at a time beginning on April 9, 1896.  His plan allowed bridge traffic—train and pedestrian—to continue without disruption. By August 27, 1897, the last pieces of the Suspension Bridge were dismantled, leaving the Lower Steel Arch Bridge—later renamed the Whirlpool Rapids Bridge—in its stead.

Over the years, the New York Central Railroad, Great Western Railway, Erie Railroad, Canadian National Railway, and Amtrak have used the bridge. In November 2009, the bridge was extensively refurbished: repairing and replacing the catwalk and some of the steel beams and rivets, sandblasting, and a paint job were among the major maintenance tasks undertaken. Amtrak took over maintenance responsibility of the rail deck from Canadian National (CN) in late 2012. Currently the Maple Leaf train service, jointly operated by Amtrak and Via Rail, is the only train to use the bridge; CN routes freight over the International Railway Bridge at Fort Erie, Ontario–Buffalo, New York instead.

Just upstream is the disused Michigan Central Railway Bridge, which, with its predecessor, the Niagara Cantilever Bridge, competed for rail traffic with the Whirlpool Rapids Bridge.

Bridge setup

The bridge has two decks. The upper deck carries the railway traffic while the lower deck is a roadway.

It is a preferred crossing for residents of the Niagara region as the lower deck roadway is reserved for passenger vehicles only—commercial vehicles and pedestrians are prohibited. The bridge may only be used by members of the NEXUS trusted traveller program, jointly operated by the Canada Border Services Agency (CBSA) and United States Customs and Border Protection (CBP). Vehicles entering Canada must pay a $5.00 USD toll electronically using an account linked to their E-ZPass transponder or NEXUS card. There is one lane of traffic to the United States and one lane to Canada, with two inspection lanes at each end for traffic entering the respective countries.

Originally built with two tracks, the second track was removed sometime in the late 1960s or early 1970s and the remaining track was centered on the bridge upper deck. The single train track crosses over the bridge on the upper deck. The track is currently used exclusively by Amtrak trains for the Maple Leaf international train service between Toronto and New York City. The Via Rail Niagara Falls station is immediately located on the Canadian side of the bridge in Niagara Falls, Ontario and the Amtrak Niagara Falls station is immediately located on the American side of the bridge in Niagara Falls, New York.

See also
 
 
 
 
 List of crossings of the Niagara River
 List of reference routes in New York
 List of bridges in Canada
 List of bridges in the United States by height

Notes

References

External links

Niagara Falls Bridge Commission
Images from the Historic Niagara Digital Collections

Amtrak bridges
Bridges completed in 1897
Bridges in Niagara Falls, New York
Bridges in Niagara Falls, Ontario
Bridges over the Niagara River
Canada–United States border crossings
Canada–United States bridges
Open-spandrel deck arch bridges in Canada
Open-spandrel deck arch bridges in the United States
Railroad bridges in New York (state)
Railway bridges in the Regional Municipality of Niagara
Road bridges in New York (state)
Road bridges in Ontario
Road-rail bridges in the United States
Steel bridges in Canada
Steel bridges in the United States
Toll bridges in Canada
Toll bridges in New York (state)
Truss arch bridges in Canada
Truss arch bridges in the United States